The debut of Russia in the Turkvision Song Contest was originally announced as taking place at the Turkvision Song Contest 2013. However, upon the publication of the finalised participation list, Russia no longer appeared as taking part.

History
Russia was originally published as scheduled to make their debut in the Turkvision Song Contest 2013 in Eskişehir, Turkey. However, upon the publication of the finalised list, they were no longer on the list, although some of Russia's federal regions were listed and have continued to participate ever since.

Federal subjects of Russia in the Turkvision Song Contest
Participants from Turkic-speaking and Turkic countries or regions are eligible to compete in the annual Turkvision Song Contests.

Russia were on the original list of participating countries for the inaugural contest in 2013 only to disappear for undisclosed reasons upon the publication of the final line-up of nations. The table below shows the list of Federal subjects of Russia who have competed in the Turkvision Song Contest as individual regional acts.

Table key

See also
 Russia in the Eurovision Dance Contest
 Russia in the Eurovision Song Contest
 Russia in the Eurovision Young Dancers
 Russia in the Eurovision Young Musicians
 Russia in the Junior Eurovision Song Contest

Notes and references

Footnotes

References

Countries in the Turkvision Song Contest
Turkvision
Turkvision